Swampy means "of or resembling a swamp".

Swampy may also refer to:

 Swampy Cree, native Americans (and their language)
 Swampy, a character in the video game Where's My Water?

People
 Swampy (environmentalist), Daniel Hooper (born 1973), an environmental activist
 Anthony Hamilton (snooker player) (born 1971), from England
 Jeff "Swampy" Marsh (born 1960), American animator
 Geoff Marsh (born 1958), Australian cricketer

Other
"Swampy", jazz instrumental by Chico Hamilton from the album Chic Chic Chico